The Ministry of Culture, Tourism and Handicrafts (French: ministère de la Culture, du Tourisme et de l'Artisanat) is a Guinean government ministry whose current minister is Alpha Soumah.

Officeholders since 2010

References 

Government ministries of Guinea
Politics of Guinea